The First Army Corps was a unit of the United States Army raised for the Spanish–American War.

As relations between Spain and the United States deteriorated in the spring of 1898, the leaders of the U.S. Army began to plan for its first large-scale campaign since the Civil War, which had ended more than 30 years previously. On April 15, 1898, the regiments of the Regular Army were ordered to various assembly points in the South, with only a handful of units to remain at their peacetime posts. The troops assembling at Camp Thomas, Georgia (in the Chickamauga Battlefield Park) were formed into a provisional field corps on April 23 under the command of Major General John R. Brooke.

After the declaration of war, General Order 36 of May 7 approved the organization of eight "army corps," each of which was to consist of three or more divisions of three brigades each. Each brigade was to have approximately 3,600 officers and enlisted men organized into three regiments and, with three such brigades, each division was to total about 11,000 officers and men. Thus the division was to be about the same size as the division of 1861, but army corps were to be larger. The division staff initially was to have an adjutant general, quartermaster, commissary, surgeon, inspector general and engineer, with an ordnance officer added later. The brigade staff was identical except that no inspector general or ordnance officer was authorized.

General Order 46 of May 16, 1898 assigned commanding officers and training camps to the new corps. Major General Brooke was named as commander of First Army Corps, which was to assemble at Camp Thomas, Georgia.

In July 1898, First Division of the First Army Corps (division numbers were not unique in this era) was assigned to the Puerto Rico expedition. On July 23, General Brooke was relieved by Major General James F. Wade, who in turn relinquished command to Brigadier General Royal T. Frank; on August 2, General Frank relinquished command to Major General Joseph C. Breckinridge. (Many accounts claim that First Corps led the invasion of Puerto Rico (as the Fifth had done at Santiago), but the troops under Brooke were the only element of the corps to take part in the expedition, which was headed by the Army's commanding general, Nelson A. Miles and included troops led by generals Guy Vernon Henry and Theodore Schwan who commanded the First Divisions of the Fourth and Seventh corps.)

As hostilities concluded and conditions at Camp Thomas deteriorated, it was decided to break up the encampment and move the troops to healthier grounds. On August 22, the Second Division of the corps was ordered to Lexington, Kentucky; the Third Division was sent to Knoxville, Tennessee at the same time. Corps headquarters and General Breckinridge moved with the Second Division.

Major General James H. Wilson (USV) succeeded General Breckenridge in command of First Army Corps on October 20, 1898. At the end of 1898, he was ordered to prepare his corps headquarters and a portion of the corps for service in Cuba. The movement began on January 7, 1899 and the troops were assigned to occupation duty in Matanzas and Santa Clara provinces.

Shortly after the movement to Cuba, First Army Corps was "discontinued" on January 16, 1899; its troops remaining in the United States were assigned to Second Army Corps as separate brigades.

References

Military units and formations of the United States in the Spanish–American War
Military units and formations established in 1898